Chlebów may refer to the following places:
Chlebów, Greater Poland Voivodeship (west-central Poland)
Chlebów, Łódź Voivodeship (central Poland)
Chlebów, Lubusz Voivodeship (west Poland)